HxD is a hex editor, disk editor, and memory editor developed by Maël Hörz for Windows.  It can open files larger than 4 GiB and open and edit the raw contents of disk drives, as well as display and edit the memory used by running processes.  Among other features, it can calculate various checksums, compare files, or shred files.

HxD is distributed as freeware and is available in multiple languages of which the English version is the first in the category of coding utilities on Download.com. The c't magazine has featured HxD in several issues and online-specials.

Features
 Disk editor (both Windows 9x/NT and up)
 Memory editor
 Data-folding to show/hide memory sections.
 Data inspector
 Converts current data into many types, for editing and viewing
 Open source plugin-framework to extend with new, custom type converters
 Multiple files are presented using a mixture of tabbed document interface and multiple document interface.
 Large files up to 8 EiB can be loaded and edited.
 Partial file loading for performance.
 Search and replace for several data types (including Unicode-strings, floats and integers).
 Calculation and checking of checksums and hashes.
 File utility operations
 File shredder for safe file deletion.
 Splitting or concatenating of files.
 File compare (only byte by byte)
 Importing and exporting of hex files (Intel HEX, Motorola S-record)
 Exporting of data to several formats
 Source code (C, Pascal, Java, C#, VB.NET, PureBasic)
 Formatted output (plain text, HTML, RTF, TeX)
 Statistical view: Graphical representation of the character distribution.
 Available in 32 and 64-bit (including memory editor)

See also
 Hex editor
 Comparison of hex editors

References

External links
 
 Review on PC World

Hex editors
Programming tools for Windows
Pascal (programming language) software